American actor and filmmaker Sylvester Stallone has appeared in over seventy-eight films. This is a list of his acting roles as well as directing, screenwriting, producing credits.

Film

Television

Theatre

Commercial

Music video

Soundtrack appearances

Video games

See also 

List of awards and nominations received by Sylvester Stallone

References

External links 

Stallone, Sylvester
Filmography
Male actor filmographies
American filmographies